Shore Transit is a public transit agency that provides commuter bus service on the Lower Eastern Shore of the state of Maryland in the United States, serving Somerset, Wicomico, and Worcester counties.  A major transfer point is located in Salisbury, Maryland, where most of the buses gather thirty minutes after every hour.

History
In October 2002, the Tri-County Council for the Lower Eastern Shore was approached by representatives from Somerset Commuter, Wicomico Transit, and Worcester County Ride, with the desire to merge the three public transit systems.  In July 2003, Wicomico Transit and Somerset Commuter merged to form Shore Transit, with Worcester County Ride joining in July 2004.

Shore Transit continues to expand to this day. As a part of the American Recovery and Reinvestment Act of 2009, Shore Transit received funding for eight new buses and a new building for its headquarters, which was located near Wor-Wic Community College, as part of the Tri-County Council building.

Services
Shore Transit has twelve bus lines through the three counties with over 200 bus stops.  The routes are mainly on the major highways in the region: U.S. Route 13, U.S. Route 50, and U.S. Route 113.  Shore Transit also has several transfer points or hubs to connect to other buses, either more of its services or to other transit agencies.

Calvert Street  In downtown Salisbury.  All but one bus routes stop here at one point during the day, most of which meet thirty minutes after every hour.  The Calvert Street hub also provides connections to Delmarva Community Transit, another commuter transit agency serving Dorchester County and is a partner of MUST, a collaborative group of public transit agencies on Maryland's Eastern Shore.

Ocean City Transfer Point Serves as a transfer point for Ocean City Transportation's Coastal Highway Beach Bus and Shore Transit during the winter months. Served by Routes 432 and 452.

West Ocean City Park and Ride Serves as a transfer point for Ocean City Transportation's West Ocean City Park-N-Ride Beach Bus and Shore Transit during the summer months.  Served by Routes 432 and 452.

Princess Anne Transfer Point  Located at Somerset Plaza.  Routes 432, 452, 706 North and 706 South serve this hub, and the buses usually gather on the hour.

Westover Park and Ride  Serves as a transfer point and is served by Routes 432, 452, 706 North and 706 South.

Routes

Shore Ride & Shore Access
Shore Transit also offers a service to those who are not located close to the fixed routes.  The service only allows those whose destinations are outside of a  distance of a fixed route stop to use it, and the requests for use must be called in.  Additionally, it provides ADA transportation to disabled customers.

Fares
Fares one-way on any bus currently cost $3.00 and there are transfer tickets that cost $1.00.  Senior fares are applicable for those over 62, and they are $1.50 one way.  Children under  ride free.

In July 2008, a seven-day pass was introduced for all riders.  This pass is refillable over seven-day periods and can be filled for up to four weeks at a time; each seven-day period costs $25.00.

References

Bus transportation in Maryland
Transportation in Somerset County, Maryland
Transportation in Wicomico County, Maryland
Transportation in Worcester County, Maryland
Transit agencies in Maryland